The Seri Teratai is the official residence of Penang's head of government, the Chief Minister of Penang. It is located in the city of George Town in Penang, Malaysia. The colonial-era double storey mansion was constructed in the early 20th century. 

Despite the building's status as the official residence of Penang's head of government, the building has been left unoccupied since 2009 due to its dilapidated condition. This changed in 2019 when Chief Minister Chow Kon Yeow moved into the premises on July after assuming office following the historic 14th General Election in 2018.

History 
The double storey mansion, known at the time as the State Guest House, was built in the early 1900s. Its architecture was believed to have been inspired by the German-born designer, Henry Alfred Neubronner.

Upon the independence of the Federation of Malaya in 1957, the building was renamed in Malay as Rumah Tetamu. It was inhabited by the first Chief Minister of Penang, Wong Pow Nee, during his tenure between 1957 and 1969.

When Koh Tsu Koon succeeded Lim Chong Eu as the Chief Minister in 1990, the former opted not to move to the mansion, choosing instead to stay in his private residence. Thus the building was left vacated until 2008, when Koh, in turn, was replaced by Lim Guan Eng as the Chief Minister. Although Lim initially moved into the mansion, he was then taken aback by its state of disrepair. Extensive termite infestation forced the then Chief Minister to instruct the state's Public Works Department (JKR) to conduct termite inspection and to repair the mansion, which was simultaneously renamed Seri Teratai. However, the exorbitant repair costs and the building's structural damage led to Lim eventually moving out in July 2009; Lim subsequently resided in his private residence at Pinhorn Road for the remainder of his tenure.

Although the current Chief Minister, Chow Kon Yeow, had expressed his intentions of moving into the mansion in 2018, his move has similarly been hampered by the building's repair costs, estimated at RM1.2 million.

See also 

 The Residency
 Suffolk House

References 

Official residences of Malaysian state leaders
Buildings and structures in George Town, Penang